The Italian military sports corps (Italian: Corpi Sportivi Militari Italiani, abbreviated C.S.), are the sports sections of the Italian Armed Forces and Polizia.

Athletes
Athletes affiliated with one of the military sports bodies receive a rank and salary equivalent to servicemen. They also receive basic military training, although the majority of their training is sport-specific and usually takes place in one of the military sports centers. 194 of the 290 athletes that represented Italy at the 2012 Summer Olympics belonged to a military sports body.

Corpi Sportivi
The Corpi Sportivi (military sports bodies), in Italy are affiliated with Italian National Olympic Committee (CONI).

See also
Italian Armed Forces
Italian National Olympic Committee

References

External links
 Gruppi sportivi militari e Corpi dello Stato from site of Italian National Olympic Committee (CONI)